Bayside (formerly Bay Side) is a station on the Long Island Rail Road's Port Washington Branch in the Bayside neighborhood of Queens, New York City. The station is located at 213th Street and 41st Avenue, off Bell Boulevard and just north of Northern Boulevard, and is 12.6 miles (20.3 km) from Penn Station in Midtown Manhattan. The station is part of CityTicket.

History
Bayside station was originally built on October 27, 1866, by the North Shore Railroad of Long Island, a subsidiary of the New York and Flushing Railroad. The station, along with the rest of the line was acquired by the Flushing and North Side Rail Road in 1869. The F&NS was consolidated into the Flushing, North Shore and Central Railroad in 1874 through a merger with the Central Railroad of Long Island, only to be leased in 1876 by the LIRR. The current station building dates to October 11, 1923. The tracks were depressed beneath Bell Boulevard from 1928 through 1930. A railway express elevator building was then opened on the eastbound side until the Port Washington Branch stopped carrying freight. The 1928 express/baggage station remains today, being converted into a local community center. The wooden pedestrian bridge that carried commuters across the tracks to both platforms was replaced in 1998 by a decorative steel bridge.

The station, along with the Port Washington Branch in general, is heavily used. During the 2005 New York City transit strike, Bayside was one of the few stations that Port Washington trains stopped at, and lesser stations such as Auburndale and Murray Hill were bypassed.

Station layout
The station has two slightly offset side platforms, each 10 cars long.

Gallery

References

External links

Platforms from Google Maps Street View
Forgotten NY.com
Pedestrian Bridge (Replacement for wooden bridge)
Views of Bayside Freight Elevator and Bell Boulevard overpass
BAY Interlocking (The LIRR Today)
Bayside Station (Arrt's Arrchives)
 Bell Boulevard entrance from Google Maps Street View

Long Island Rail Road stations in New York City
Railway stations in Queens, New York
Bayside, Queens
Railway stations in the United States opened in 1866
Railway stations in the United States opened in 1923
1866 establishments in New York (state)